2014 Champions League may refer to:

Football
2013–14 UEFA Champions League
2014–15 UEFA Champions League
2014 AFC Champions League
2014 CAF Champions League

Cricket
2014 Champions League Twenty20